In People v. Antommarchi, 80 NY2d 247 (1992), the statutory rights of a defendant to be present during any sidebar questioning of a prospective juror concerning his or her impartiality was affirmed by the New York Court of Appeals.  Such rights are generally known as the Antommarchi Rights.

References

U.S. state criminal procedure
New York (state) law